Jay Hill (born December 8, 1964) is an American former racing driver from Lake Geneva, Wisconsin.

Hill participated in one Toyota Atlantic race in 1991 at the Mid-Ohio Sports Car Course, finishing 9th. In 1992 he drove in the CART IndyCar World Series' Detroit Grand Prix in a year old Buick powered Lola fielded by Burns Racing. Starting last on the 25 car grid, he finished the race 7 laps down in 15th.

Racing record

SCCA National Championship Runoffs

References

1964 births
Atlantic Championship drivers
Champ Car drivers
Living people
People from Lake Geneva, Wisconsin
Racing drivers from Wisconsin
SCCA National Championship Runoffs winners